Kuala Kencana (literally "golden estuary") is a district in Mimika Regency, Central Papua, Indonesia. It is the purpose-built company town, managed by Indonesian mineral extraction company PT Freeport Indonesia. The new town was inaugurated by Indonesian President Suharto in 1995. The district covers an area of 860.74 km2 and had a population of 18,290 at the 2010 Census and 27,774 at the 2020 Census.

The town features running water and other modern amenities previously rarely seen in Papua, though critics note this has come at a cost of dispossession of indigenous populations and environmental damage.

Climate
Kuala Kencana has a tropical rainforest climate (Af) with heavy to very heavy rainfall year-round.

See also
 Tembagapura, another district and company town built by Freeport-McMoran in Mimika.

References

External links

Other references

Mimika Regency
Populated places in Central Papua
1995 establishments in Indonesia
Planned townships in Indonesia
Post-independence architecture of Indonesia